Sweet Valley is an electronic music duo consisting of Wavves member Nathan Williams and his brother, Joel "Kynan" Williams. The band describes themselves as " a blood pact between two brothers, Nathan (of Wavves) & Kynan Williams, gone awesomely off the rails," or as "a Bermuda Triangle-like place, where cannabis crumbs, spilt beer, record dust and that mysterious shit you had to blow out of game cartridges all collect as if pulled by some gigantic junkyard magnet." They originated, and are based, in Los Angeles, California. The two began in 2012, when Nathan asked his brother to create music with him, now that they were living in the same home, "or else [Joel] would just be sitting around smoking my weed all day." As of 2014, the group is also working on an additional project titled Spirit Club, which recently released a full album. The band also makes remixes of songs of different genres available on an affiliated SoundCloud page.

History

2012–13: Stay Calm, Eternal Champ, Tour, Jenova, & SV

Stay Calm
On August 7, 2012, the group released their first mixtape, Stay Calm, consisting of 9 songs, one of them only lasting for 30 seconds. They had teamed up with Rihanna producer John Hill to create the album.
The album was released through Fool's Gold Records.

Eternal Champ
On September 12 of that same year, Joel and Nathan Williams released a second album, titled Eternal Champ, which received a score of 6.6 on Pitchfork Media. This collection of 13 songs heavily employs sampling, from Lex Luger, to Three 6 Mafia.

Tour with GZA
Only two days after the release of the Eternal Champ kicked off the first concert along the tour with Brooklyn-born Wu-Tang Clan rapper Gza. The tour also included Hip-Hop artist Killer Mike, and post-punk band Bear Hands.

Jenova
Exactly three months later, December 12, 2012, watched the release of Jenova. This album contains a total of 17 songs, one of which, Hurricane, was played in the teaser released on YouTube for the album.

SV
On 11 July 2013, Sweet Valley released their fourth album through Fool's Gold. This album, titled SV, contains 12 tracks.

2014-present: So Serene, Ghetto Cuisine, F.A.N.G, & MNDR: Dance 4 a Dollar

So Serene
10 February 2014 was the release date of Sweet Valley's $1, 27 minute, 33 second long "song," So Serene.

Ghetto Cuisine
Early April, 2014, rapper DaVinci released an album titled Ghetto Cuisine, produced by Sweet Valley. Two music videos for songs off the album were released on the Fool's Gold Records website.

F.A.N.G.
The Sweet Valley album F.A.N.G. was released on 16 May 2014. Very little is known about the album, due to a lack of information or promotion available from Sweet Valley affiliates. The meaning behind the acronym F.A.N.G. is not known at this time.

MNDR: Dance 4 a Dollar
Likely the most known and most anticipated EP ever created by Sweet Valley, the collaboration album with pop music singer MNDR was released 17 February 2015. The song Liars, with MNDR, was used in the 2015 film, Entourage.

Present
Sweet Valley performed at SXSW on March 18, 2015. The team collaborated with rappers Soulja Boy and Juicy J to release the song "Big Blue," released on 6 May 2015. They also released a collaboration with GZA (with whom they also toured in 2013) for a Converse CONS EP. Little is known about upcoming projects and release dates, although a new release is possible soon according to some videos uploaded by Joel on Instagram.

Discography

Albums

Collaboration albums

Extended plays

Singles

Concert tours
 64 Squares with GZA, Killer Mike, & Bear Hands (2012)

See also
 Wavves
 MNDR

References

External links
 
 Wavves
 Interview with Sweet Valley on Pitchfork

Musical groups from Los Angeles
American hip hop groups
Musical groups established in 2012
2012 establishments in California